The 2000 USC Trojans baseball team represented the University of Southern California in the 2000 NCAA Division I baseball season. The Trojans played their home games at Dedeaux Field. The team was coached by Mike Gillespie in his 14th year at USC.

The Trojans won the Fullerton Regional and the East Regional to advance to the College World Series, where they were defeated by the Florida State Seminoles.

Roster

Schedule 

! style="" | Regular Season: 38–18
|- valign="top" 

|- align="center" bgcolor="#ddffdd"
| 1 || January 29 || at No. 26  || No. 15 || Eddy D. Field Stadium • Malibu, California || W 7–3 || 1–0 || —
|- align="center" bgcolor="#ddffdd"
| 2 || January 30 || No. 26 Pepperdine|| No. 15 || Dedeaux Field • Los Angeles, California || W 8–1 || 2–0 || —
|-

|- align="center" bgcolor="#ddffdd"
| 3 || February 4 || No. 22  || No. 15 || Dedeaux Field • Los Angeles, California || W 3–2 || 3–0 || —
|- align="center" bgcolor="#ffdddd"
| 4 || February 5 || at No. 22 Long Beach State || No. 15 || Blair Field • Long Beach, California || L 3–13 || 3–1 || —
|- align="center" bgcolor="#ddffdd"
| 5 || February 6 || No. 22 Long Beach State || No. 15 || Dedeaux Field • Los Angeles, California || W 9–2 || 4–1 || —
|- align="center" bgcolor="#ddffdd"
| 6 || February 8 || at  || No. 15 || George C. Page Stadium • Los Angeles, California || W 9–8 || 5–1 || —
|- align="center" bgcolor="#ffdddd"
| 7 || February 11 || at No. 18  || No. 15 || Dan Law Field • Lubbock, Texas || L 3–4 || 5–2 || —
|- align="center" bgcolor="#ddffdd"
| 8 || February 12 || at No. 18 Texas Tech || No. 15 || Dan Law Field • Lubbock, Texas || W 9–4 || 6–2 || —
|- align="center" bgcolor="#ffdddd"
| 9 || February 13 || at No. 18 Texas Tech || No. 15 || Dan Law Field • Lubbock, Texas || L 7–20 || 6–3 || —
|- align="center" bgcolor="#ddffdd"
| 10 || February 15 || at No. 6  || No. 17 || Titan Field • Fullerton, California || W 7–6 || 7–3 || —
|- align="center" bgcolor="#ddffdd"
| 11 || February 22 ||  || No. 16 || Dedeaux Field • Los Angeles, California || W 7–3 || 8–3 || —
|- align="center" bgcolor="#ddffdd"
| 12 || February 25 || No. 15 UCLA || No. 16 || Dedeaux Field • Los Angeles, California || W 10–7 || 9–3 || —
|- align="center" bgcolor="#ddffdd"
| 13 || February 26 || No. 15 UCLA || No. 16 || Dedeaux Field • Los Angeles, California || W 4–3 || 10–3 || —
|-

|- align="center" bgcolor="#ddffdd"
| 14 || March 3 || vs. No. 6  || No. 11 || Titan Field • Fullerton, California || W 9–2 || 11–33 || —
|- align="center" bgcolor="#ddffdd"
| 15 || March 4 || vs. No. 23  || No. 11 || Titan Field • Fullerton, California || W 7–1 || 12–3 || —
|- align="center" bgcolor="#ddffdd"
| 16 || March 7 ||  || No. 5 || Dedeaux Field • Los Angeles, California || W 6–5 || 13–3 || —
|- align="center" bgcolor="#ffdddd"
| 17 || March 10 || at No. 17 Houston || No. 5 || Schroeder Park • Houston, Texas || L 2–3 || 13–4 || —
|- align="center" bgcolor="#ffdddd"
| 18 || March 11 || at No. 17 Houston || No. 5 || Schroeder Park • Houston, Texas || L 7–14 || 13–5 || —
|- align="center" bgcolor="#ffdddd"
| 19 || March 12 || at No. 17 Houston || No. 5 || Schroeder Park • Houston, Texas || L 4–8 || 13–6 || —
|- align="center" bgcolor="#ffdddd"
| 20 || March 14 || at  || No. 12 || John Cunningham Stadium • San Diego, California || L 4–10 || 13–7 || —
|- align="center" bgcolor="#ddffdd"
| 21 || March 14 || at San Diego || No. 12 || John Cunningham Stadium • San Diego, California || W 5–3 || 14–7 || —
|- align="center" bgcolor="#ffdddd"
| 22 || March 17 || at No. 3 Stanford || No. 12 || Sunken Diamond • Stanford, California || L 3–4 || 14–8 || —
|- align="center" bgcolor="#ddffdd"
| 23 || March 18 || at No. 3 Stanford || No. 12 || Sunken Diamond • Stanford, California || W 11–7 || 15–8 || —
|- align="center" bgcolor="#ffdddd"
| 24 || March 19 || at No. 3 Stanford || No. 12 || Sunken Diamond • Stanford, California || L 4–11 || 15–9 || —
|- align="center" bgcolor="#ddffdd"
| 25 || March 21 || Loyola Marymount || No. 13 || Dedeaux Field • Los Angeles, California || W 7–3 || 16–9 || —
|- align="center" bgcolor="#ddffdd"
| 26 || March 24 ||  || No. 13 || Dedeaux Field • Los Angeles, California || W 7–6 || 17–9 || 1–0
|- align="center" bgcolor="#ddffdd"
| 27 || March 25 || Washington State || No. 13 || Dedeaux Field • Los Angeles, California || W 12–7 || 18–9 || 2–0
|- align="center" bgcolor="#ddffdd"
| 28 || March 26 || Washington State || No. 13 || Dedeaux Field • Los Angeles, California || W 10–1 || 19–9 || 3–0
|- align="center" bgcolor="#ddffdd"
| 29 || March 28 || at  || No. 10 || Tony Gwynn Stadium • San Diego, California || W 11–4 || 20–9 || —
|- align="center" bgcolor="#ffdddd"
| 30 || March 31 || at Arizona || No. 10 || Jerry Kindall Field at Frank Sancet Stadium • Tucson, Arizona || L 4–11 || 20–10 || 3–1
|-

|- align="center" bgcolor="#ddffdd"
| 31 || April 1 || at Arizona || No. 10 || Jerry Kindall Field at Frank Sancet Stadium • Tucson, Arizona || W 20–9 || 21–10 || 4–1
|- align="center" bgcolor="#ddffdd"
| 32 || April 2 || at Arizona || No. 10 || Jerry Kindall Field at Frank Sancet Stadium • Tucson, Arizona || W 6–2 || 22–10 || 5–1
|- align="center" bgcolor="#ffdddd"
| 33 || April 5 || No. 11  || No. 10 || Dedeaux Field • Los Angeles, California || L 4–5 || 22–11 || —
|- align="center" bgcolor="#ddffdd"
| 34 || April 7 || at No. 25 UCLA || No. 10 || Jackie Robinson Stadium • Los Angeles, California || W 5–1 || 23–11 || 6–1
|- align="center" bgcolor="#ffdddd"
| 35 || April 8 || at No. 25 UCLA || No. 10 || Jackie Robinson Stadium • Los Angeles, California || L 5–15 || 23–12 || 6–2
|- align="center" bgcolor="#ffdddd"
| 36 || April 9 || at No. 25 UCLA || No. 10 || Jackie Robinson Stadium • Los Angeles, California || L 5–8 || 23–13 || 6–3
|- align="center" bgcolor="#ddffdd"
| 37 || April 11 || San Diego State || No. 16 || Dedeaux Field • Los Angeles, California || W 6–4 || 24–13 || —
|- align="center" bgcolor="#ddffdd"
| 38 || April 14 || at  || No. 16 || Evans Diamond • Berkeley, California || W 6–5 || 25–13 || 7–3
|- align="center" bgcolor="#ffdddd"
| 39 || April 15 || at California || No. 16 || Evans Diamond • Berkeley, California || L 5–9 || 25–14 || 7–4
|- align="center" bgcolor="#ffdddd"
| 40 || April 16 || at California || No. 16 || Evans Diamond • Berkeley, California || L 3–4 || 25–15 || 7–5
|- align="center" bgcolor="#ddffdd"
| 41 || April 18 || No. 19 UCLA || No. 22 || Dedeaux Field • Los Angeles, California || W 6–2 || 26–15 || —
|- align="center" bgcolor="#ddffdd"
| 42 || April 20 || No. 4 Stanford || No. 22 || Dedeaux Field • Los Angeles, California || W 7–3 || 27–15 || 8–5
|- align="center" bgcolor="#ffdddd"
| 43 || April 21 || No. 4 Stanford || No. 22 || Dedeaux Field • Los Angeles, California || L 1–4 || 27–16 || 8–6
|- align="center" bgcolor="#ffdddd"
| 44 || April 22 || No. 4 Stanford || No. 22 || Dedeaux Field • Los Angeles, California || L 4–18 || 27–17 || 8–7
|- align="center" bgcolor="#ddffdd"
| 45 || April 25 || at UC Santa Barbara || No. 23 || Caesar Uyesaka Stadium • Santa Barbara, California || W 9–3 || 28–17 || —
|- align="center" bgcolor="#ffdddd"
| 46 || April 28 || No. 3  || No. 23 || Dedeaux Field • Los Angeles, California || L 1–3 || 28–18 || 8–8
|- align="center" bgcolor="#ddffdd"
| 47 || April 29 || No. 3 Arizona State || No. 23 || Dedeaux Field • Los Angeles, California || W 12–2 || 29–18 || 9–8
|- align="center" bgcolor="#ddffdd"
| 48 || April 30 || No. 3 Arizona State || No. 23 || Dedeaux Field • Los Angeles, California || W 4–3 || 30–18 || 10–8
|-

|- align="center" bgcolor="#ddffdd"
| 49 || May 2 ||  || No. 20 || Dedeaux Field • Los Angeles, California || W 6–2 || 31–18 || —
|- align="center" bgcolor="#ddffdd"
| 50 || May 10 || at No. 17 Cal State Fullerton || No. 20 || Titan Field • Fullerton, California || W 8–3 || 32–18 || —
|- align="center" bgcolor="#ddffdd"
| 51 || May 12 ||  || No. 20 || Dedeaux Field • Los Angeles, California || W 12–1 || 33–18 || 11–8
|- align="center" bgcolor="#ddffdd"
| 52 || May 13 || Oregon State || No. 20 || Dedeaux Field • Los Angeles, California || W 16–7 || 34–18 || 12–8
|- align="center" bgcolor="#ddffdd"
| 53 || May 14 || Oregon State || No. 20 || Dedeaux Field • Los Angeles, California || W 16–3 || 35–18 || 13–8
|- align="center" bgcolor="#ddffdd"
| 54 || May 19 || at  || No. 20 || Husky Ballpark • Seattle, Washington || W 6–1 || 36–18 || 14–8
|- align="center" bgcolor="#ddffdd"
| 55 || May 20 || at Washington || No. 20 || Husky Ballpark • Seattle, Washington || W 13–3 || 37–18 || 15–8
|- align="center" bgcolor="#ddffdd"
| 56 || May 21 || at Washington || No. 20 || Husky Ballpark • Seattle, Washington || W 4–3 || 38–18 || 16–8
|-

|-
! style="" | Postseason: 6–2
|- valign="top"

|- align="center" bgcolor="#ddffdd"
| 57 || May 26 || vs. (4)  || (1) No. 16 || Titan Field • Fullerton, California || W 8–3 || 39–18 || 1–0
|- align="center" bgcolor="#ddffdd"
| 58 || May 27 || vs. (3) No. 20 Loyola Marymount || (1) No. 16 || Titan Field • Fullerton, California || W 13–3 || 40–18 || 2–0
|- align="center" bgcolor="#ddffdd"
| 59 || May 28 || at (2) No. 17 Cal State Fullerton || (1) No. 16 || Titan Field • Fullerton, California || W 8–3 || 41–18 || 3–0
|-

|- align="center" bgcolor="#ddffdd"
| 60 || June 2 || at (3) No. 1 Georgia Tech || No. 13 || Russ Chandler Stadium • Atlanta, Georgia || W 7–2 || 42–18 || 4–0
|- align="center" bgcolor="#ddffdd"
| 61 || June 3 || at (3) No. 1 Georgia Tech || No. 13 || Russ Chandler Stadium • Atlanta, Georgia || W 6–3 || 43–18 || 5–0
|-

|- align="center" bgcolor="#ddffdd"
| 62 || June 10 || vs. (6) No. 4 Florida State || No. 5 || Johnny Rosenblatt Stadium • Omaha, Nebraska || W 6–4 || 44–18 || 1–0
|- align="center" bgcolor="#ffdddd"
| 63 || June 12 || vs. (2) No. 2 LSU || No. 5 || Johnny Rosenblatt Stadium • Omaha, Nebraska || L 4–10 || 44–19 || 1–1
|- align="center" bgcolor="#ffdddd"
| 64 || June 14 || vs. (6) No. 4 Florida State || No. 5 || Johnny Rosenblatt Stadium • Omaha, Nebraska || L 2–3 || 44–20 || 2–1
|-

|

Awards and honors 
Beau Craig
 College World Series All-Tournament Team
 First Team All-Pac-10

Rik Currier
 Second Team All-American Baseball America
 Second Team All-American Collegiate Baseball
 Second Team All-American The Sports Network
 Third Team All-American National Collegiate Baseball Writers Association
 Pac-10 Conference Pitcher of the Year

Seth Davidson
 Honorable Mention All-Pac-10

Rob Garibaldi
 Honorable Mention All-Pac-10

Justin Gemoll
 Second Team All-American Baseball America
 Third Team All-American Collegiate Baseball
 First Team All-Pac-10

Anthony Lunetta
 Second Team Freshman All-American Baseball America
 First Team Freshman All-American Collegiate Baseball
 Pac-10 Conference Newcomer of the Year

Josh Persell
 Honorable Mention All-Pac-10

Mark Prior
 Honorable Mention All-Pac-10

Anthony Reyes
 Second Team Freshman All-American Baseball America
 Honorable Mention All-Pac-10

References 

USC Trojans baseball seasons
USC Trojans baseball
College World Series seasons
USC
USC